Taeyeon discography may refer to:
 Taeyeon albums discography
 Taeyeon singles discography
 List of songs recorded by Taeyeon

Taeyeon